Ganja Mall is a shopping mall located in Ganja, and it's the largest mall in the city. It was opened in 10 october 2017

References

Buildings and structures in Ganja, Azerbaijan
Shopping malls in Azerbaijan
2017 establishments in Azerbaijan
Shopping malls established in 2017